Gol Faraj (also known as Gulfaraj and Kal Faraj) is a village in Shoja Rural District, in the Central District of Jolfa County, East Azerbaijan Province, Iran. At the 2006 census, its population was 83, in 21 families.

References 

Populated places in Jolfa County